Simon Black (born 3 April 1979) is a former Australian rules football player and current assistant coach, who played his whole career with the Brisbane Lions in the Australian Football League (AFL).

Black was a midfielder with a reputation for hard work and skill. He had the ability to get under the pack to retrieve the ball as well as deliver it with precision to teammates.

He was drafted by the Brisbane Lions in 1997 from the East Fremantle Football Club, and he debuted in the first game of the 1998 season and quickly became one of Brisbane's best players. He became Brisbane’s third Brownlow Medalists by winning the much coveted award in 2002. He also won the 2003 Norm Smith Medal and the 2001, 2002, and 2006 Merrett-Murray Medals awarded to the best and fairest player with the Brisbane Lions and three premiership medallions he received as a part of the Lions' hat-trick of premierships in 2001, 2002 and 2003. Black, along with  Michael Voss (1996 Brownlow Medalist), Jason Akermanis (2001 Brownlow Medalist) and Nigel Lappin were collectively known as  ‘The Fab Four’ and are widely considered to be one of the best midfield combinations in the history of the game.

Black is currently serving as the Contest Skills and Midfield Coach at the Brisbane Lions.

Background
Born in Mount Isa, Queensland, to Western Australian mother and father Ray a dairy farmer of Kaitaia in New Zealand. He relocated to Western Australia with his family at a very young age, where he attended school at Corpus Christi College in Bateman and Aquinas College, Perth. Nurtured by his father, Black initially played rugby union with dreams of being an All Black thanks to his New Zealand heritage but later took up Australian rules. He was a standout junior 800m and 1500m runner as a junior. At age 15 he suffered a back injury that required him to not play football for 18 months. He joined East Fremantle Football Club and represented Western Australia in the 1997 edition of the AFL Under 18 Championships where he earned All-Australian honours. He was a member of East Fremantle's losing 1997 WAFL Grand Final team. Black was drafted by the Brisbane Lions with the 31st selection in the 1997 National Draft.

Playing career

Early career
Black was impressive during the 1998 pre-season and earned his senior debut in Round 1 against the Western Bulldogs at the Gabba. He played nine senior matches and averaged over 12 disposals during his debut season and took out the Club’s Best First Year Player award. In 1999, he consolidated himself as an automatic senior selection and built a reputation for winning the ball in contested situations. He collected 20 possessions and kicked two goals against Geelong in Round 9 which earned him an AFL Rising Star Nomination; he ultimately finished third in the award behind Sydney’s Adam Goodes and Adelaide’s Brett Burton. He played 22 matches for the season and averaged close to 19 disposals and won the Lions' Rookie of the Year award for the second consecutive season. In 2000, he averaged 23.9 disposals per game, led the competition in centre clearances on a per game basis and finished second behind Geelong’s Garry Hocking in hard-ball gets.

Premiership era
Black became one of the league's elite midfielders from 2001. Over the following four years, Black and the Lions contested four Grand Finals, winning the premiership in 2001, 2002 and 2003, and finishing runner-up in 2004. During that time, Black was part of a Brisbane midfield combination which is considered to be one of the best in the league's history: Black, Michael Voss, Jason Akermanis and Nigel Lappin, who became known collectively as the "Fab Four".

In 2001, Black played every match for the season, led the AFL in tackles and averaged a team-high 24.6 possessions. He was joint Club Champion with Captain Michael Voss, was named as the starting ruck-rover in the All-Australian team, finished 5th in the AFLPA's Most Valuable Player award, and won the Herald Sun Player of the Year award. He represented Australia for the first and only time of his career in the 2001 International Rules Series against Ireland.

In 2002, Black won the Brownlow Medal, polling 25 votes to beat second placed Josh Francou by four votes and comparisons were made between him and dual Brownlow Medallist Greg Williams because of his outstanding peripheral vision and ability to get the contested ball. He earned All-Australian selection and won the Merrett-Murray Medal for the second consecutive season. He was strong again in 2003, and won the Norm Smith Medal as best on ground in the Grand Final with a career-best 39 possessions, the most ever recorded by any player in a Grand Final — it remained the sole highest until it was eventually equalled by Christian Petracca’s performance in 2021.

In 2004, Black became a vice-captain of the Lions, and he won All-Australian selection for the third time in his career. At the end of the season, Black had played a sequence of 107 consecutive matches for Brisbane, before a suspension in the violent 2004 AFL Grand Final ended the sequence.

Later career
Black's 2005 season was interrupted by injury, but in 2006 he played every match, and won the third Merrett-Murray Medal of his career. At the beginning of 2007, Black was named as one of the four Lions co-captains, replacing the retiring captain Michael Voss. In 2007 and 2008, Black continued to be Brisbane's premier midfielder, and he finished second in the Brownlow Medal in both seasons. He earned Brisbane Lions Life Membership at the end of his tenth season of service. He was also the Courier Mail Player of the Year in 2008, and was runner-up in the 2008 Merrett-Murray medal.

In 2009, new coach Michael Voss named Jonathan Brown as the sole captain of the club, and Black remained in the leadership group. He had another consistent season in 2010, finishing second in the Merrett-Murray Medal. In 2012, Black played his 300th AFL game, becoming the first player in league history to win a Brownlow Medal, a Norm Smith Medal, a Premiership Medal and play 300 games.

In 2013, Black equalled Marcus Ashcroft's record for the most games played for the Brisbane Bears/Lions playing his 318th game.

On 18 October 2013, Black announced his retirement from the AFL.

Coaching career
Shortly after announcing his retirement from the AFL, Black signed on as an assistant coach at the Lions for two years. His main focus is coaching the team's forward line and attacking systems.

In 2016, Black founded the Simon Black Australian Rules Academy, a full time sport and educational program which provides pathways for students to pursue University and Fitness qualifications while training and playing AFL in an elite academy environment. He subsequently resigned from his role as a coach at the Brisbane Lions to focus on growing the Academy program.

Media career
In August 2019, Black joined 10 News First Queensland as an AFL analyst.

In 2019, Black competed in the fourth season of Australian Survivor. He was eliminated on Day 42 and finished in 7th place.

Statistics

|- style="background-color: #EAEAEA"
! scope="row" style="text-align:center" | 1998
|style="text-align:center;"|
| 20 || 9 || 2 || 5 || 73 || 37 || 110 || 28 || 11 || 0.2 || 0.6 || 8.1 || 4.1 || 12.2 || 3.1 || 1.2 || 0
|-
! scope="row" style="text-align:center" | 1999
|style="text-align:center;"|
| 20 || 22 || 19 || 14 || 260 || 156 || 416 || 70 || 60 || 0.9 || 0.6 || 11.8 || 7.1 || 18.9 || 3.2 || 2.7 || 9
|- style="background:#eaeaea;"
! scope="row" style="text-align:center" | 2000
|style="text-align:center;"|
| 20 || 19 || 16 || 12 || 273 || 181 || 454 || 61 || 62 || 0.8 || 0.6 || 14.4 || 9.5 || 23.9 || 3.2 || 3.3 || 4
|-
| scope="row" bgcolor="F0E68C" | 2001#
|style="text-align:center;"|
| 20 || 25 || 23 || 17 || 308 || bgcolor=CAE1FF | 314† || bgcolor=CAE1FF | 622† || 79 || bgcolor=CAE1FF | 119† || 0.9 || 0.7 || 12.3 || 12.6 || 24.9 || 3.2 || 4.8 || 12
|- style="background:#eaeaea;"
| scope="row" bgcolor="F0E68C" | 2002#
|style="text-align:center;"|
| 20 || 25 || 17 || 18 || 288 || bgcolor=CAE1FF | 294† || bgcolor=CAE1FF | 582† || 84 || bgcolor=CAE1FF | 115† || 0.7 || 0.7 || 11.5 || 11.8 || 23.3 || 3.4 || 4.6 || bgcolor="98FB98" | 25
|-
| scope="row" bgcolor="F0E68C" | 2003#
|style="text-align:center;"|
| 20 || 26 || 16 || 14 || 326 || 308 || 634 || 73 || 113 || 0.6 || 0.5 || 12.5 || 11.8 || 24.4 || 2.8 || 4.3 || 12
|- style="background:#eaeaea;"
! scope="row" style="text-align:center" | 2004
|style="text-align:center;"|
| 20 || 25 || 13 || 11 || 284 || 307 || 591 || 57 || 97 || 0.5 || 0.4 || 11.4 || 12.3 || 23.6 || 2.3 || 3.9 || 18
|-
! scope="row" style="text-align:center" | 2005
|style="text-align:center;"|
| 20 || 18 || 10 || 8 || 213 || 183 || 396 || 50 || 48 || 0.6 || 0.4 || 11.8 || 10.2 || 22.0 || 2.8 || 2.7 || 6
|-style="background:#eaeaea;"
! scope="row" style="text-align:center" | 2006
|style="text-align:center;"|
| 20 || 22 || 8 || 4 || 257 || 273 || 530 || 63 || 108 || 0.4 || 0.2 || 11.7 || 12.4 || 24.1 || 2.9 || 4.9 || 11
|-
! scope="row" style="text-align:center" | 2007
|style="text-align:center;"|
| 20 || 21 || 9 || 11 || 244 || 222 || 466 || 45 || 91 || 0.4 || 0.5 || 11.6 || 10.6 || 22.2 || 2.1 || 4.3 || 22
|-style="background:#eaeaea;"
! scope="row" style="text-align:center" | 2008
|style="text-align:center;"|
| 20 || 21 || 10 || 9 || 253 || 286 || 539 || 61 || 87 || 0.5 || 0.4 || 12.0 || 13.6 || 25.7 || 2.9 || 4.1 || 23
|-
! scope="row" style="text-align:center" | 2009
|style="text-align:center;"|
| 20 || 23 || 10 || 7 || 256 || 328 || 584 || 65 || 112 || 0.4 || 0.3 || 11.1 || 14.3 || 25.4 || 2.8 || 4.9 || 19
|-style="background:#eaeaea;"
! scope="row" style="text-align:center" | 2010
|style="text-align:center;"|
| 20 || 18 || 6 || 4 || 222 || 238 || 460 || 74 || 69 || 0.3 || 0.2 || 12.3 || 13.2 || 25.6 || 4.1 || 3.8 || 3
|-
! scope="row" style="text-align:center" | 2011
|style="text-align:center;"|
| 20 || 22 || 4 || 9 || 285 || 305 || 590 || 62 || 95 || 0.2 || 0.4 || 13.0 || 13.9 || 26.8 || 2.8 || 4.3 || 9
|-style="background:#eaeaea;"
! scope="row" style="text-align:center" | 2012
|style="text-align:center;"|
| 20 || 18 || 5 || 6 || 180 || 247 || 427 || 48 || 67 || 0.3 || 0.3 || 10.0 || 13.7 || 23.7 || 2.7 || 3.7 || 6
|-
! scope="row" style="text-align:center" | 2013
|style="text-align:center;"|
| 20 || 8 || 3 || 5 || 77 || 102 || 179 || 17 || 29 || 0.4 || 0.6 || 9.6 || 12.8 || 22.4 || 2.1 || 3.6 || 5
|- class="sortbottom"
! colspan=3| Career
! 322
! 171
! 154
! 3799
! 3781
! 7580
! 937
! 1283
! 0.5
! 0.5
! 11.8
! 11.7
! 23.5
! 2.9
! 4.0
! 184
|}

Honours and achievements
Team
3× AFL Premiership (Brisbane): 2001, 2002, 2003
Individual
Brownlow Medal: 2002
3× Merrett–Murray Medal (Brisbane Best & Fairest): 2001, 2002, 2006
King of the Pride: 2007 - 2016
3× All-Australian: 2001, 2002, 2004
Norm Smith Medal: 2003
Australian Representative Honours in International Rules Football: 2001
Marcus Ashcroft Medal: 2011 (Round 21)
Brisbane Lions Captain: 2007-2008
AFL Rising Star Nominee: 1999 (Round 9)

In June 2019, it was announced that Black had been voted into the Australian Football Hall of Fame for the class of 2018, but due to his commitments to filming Australian Survivor he was unable to attend the induction ceremony. He was officially inducted in 2020.

References

External links

1979 births
Living people
All-Australians (AFL)
Australian rules footballers from Western Australia
East Fremantle Football Club players
Brisbane Lions captains
Brisbane Lions players
Brisbane Lions Premiership players
Brownlow Medal winners
Merrett–Murray Medal winners
Norm Smith Medal winners
Australian people of New Zealand descent
Australian people of Māori descent
People educated at Aquinas College, Perth
People educated at Corpus Christi College, Perth
People from Mount Isa
Western Australian Sports Star of the Year winners
West Australian Football Hall of Fame inductees
Australia international rules football team players
Australian Survivor contestants
Australian Football Hall of Fame inductees
Three-time VFL/AFL Premiership players